Debasis Mitra (born November 3, 1944 in Kolkata) is an Indian-American mathematician, known for his numerous contributions to the theory of communication systems, control theory and queueing theory.

He got his B.Sc. (1964) and Ph.D. (1968) in electrical engineering from University of London, on an Atomic Energy Research fellowship (1965–67), while he was simultaneously affiliated with the Control systems center at the University of Manchester.  His work focused on control of nuclear power systems.
He then  joined Bell Labs as a member of the technical staff (1968), 
working on semiconductor networks, diffusion models for service adoption and
traffic modeling.  Mitra was head of Mathematics of Networks and Systems research division (1986–99),  and was vice president of the math and algorithmic science center.  Mitra has served as editor and as part of  the editorial board of numerous scientific publications, and was visiting professor at University of California (1984).

In 2003, Mitra was elected a member of the National Academy of Engineering for his "contributions to the modeling, analysis and design of communication networks." He retired from Bell Labs in 2013 and joined the Columbia University Electrical Engineering department.  His current research interests are in the scientific foundations of policy that impact engineers and engineering systems, especially in models, analyses and syntheses of organizational and individual interactions. Instances are network neutrality, network economics, and the science and management of innovations and knowledge-creation.

He holds 21 patents, and, as of November 11, 2015, his publications have been cited 11,332 times. His h-index is 55.

Awards
 Premium award for best publication (IEEE, England, 1967)
 IEEE Fellow (1988)
 Steven O. Rice Prize Paper (1992)  for his paper Asymptotically Optimal Design of Congestion Control for High Speed Data Networks.
 Bell labs fellow (1998)
 IEEE Eric E. Sumner Award for the contributions to echo cancellation (1998)
 Elected to the National Academy of Engineering for contributions to communications systems (2003)
 ACM SIGMETRICS Achievement Award for his fundamental contributions to the modeling, analysis, and design of communication networks (2012)

References

Queueing theorists
20th-century Indian mathematicians
Scientists at Bell Labs
Fellow Members of the IEEE
Alumni of the University of London
1944 births
Living people
Members of the United States National Academy of Engineering
Columbia School of Engineering and Applied Science faculty
Scientists from Kolkata